"FutureSex/LoveSound" is a song recorded by American singer and songwriter Justin Timberlake for his second studio album, FutureSex/LoveSounds (2006). It was written and produced by Timberlake, Timothy "Timbaland" Mosley and Nate "Danja" Hills. The song was produced following Timberlake's two-year hiatus from the music industry, when he felt "burnt out" after the release of his debut solo album Justified in 2002. "FutureSex/LoveSound"  incorporates elements of new wave and industrial rock into its production. "FutureSex/LoveSound" peaked at number 13 on the Billboard Bubbling Under Hot 100 Singles chart. It was included on the set list of Timberlake's second worldwide tour FutureSex/LoveShow (2007).

Background and production 
After the release of his debut solo album Justified in 2002, Timberlake thought he "lost his voice" in the sense that he did not like what he was doing. He felt "burnt-out" after Justified; this partly changed his career's direction, and he took a break from the music industry and instead appeared in films. The first role he took during this time was as a journalist in the thriller Edison Force, filmed in 2004 and released on July 18, 2006. He also appeared in the films Alpha Dog, Black Snake Moan, Richard Kelly's Southland Tales, and voiced Prince Artie Pendragon in the animated film Shrek the Third, released on May 18, 2007.

When he felt inspired to compose songs again, he did not choose to reunite with his former band 'NSYNC, although he considered it after his first record. Instead, he went to Justified collaborator Timothy "Timbaland" Mosley's studio in Virginia Beach, Virginia to begin sessions for his second album. However, neither of them had an idea of what the album would be–no plan for it and even a title. "FutureSex/LoveSound" was written and produced by Timbaland, Nate "Danja" Hills and Timberlake himself. The song was recorded by Jimmy Douglas, while its mixing was done by Douglas with Timbaland at The Hit Factory Criteria in Miami. The keys were played by Danja, who also provided the drums with Timbaland. Paul Blake played the guitar and Timberlake sang the background vocals.

Composition 

"FutureSex/LoveSound" incorporates elements of new wave and industrial rock into its production. It was written in the key of F#minor, in common time, with a tempo of 104 beats per minute. Timberlake's vocal range spans from the low note of A3 to the high note of G#5. Timberlake sings in a "muted whisper slink" and his distorted voice "drones" over a "very produced" beat. Bernard Zuel of The Sydney Morning Herald stated that Timberlake morphs into "Michael Hutchence at his most lizard-like". According to Spence D. of IGN, the beat is a "throwback from the future past of disco's demented dimension".

The song contains a "rolling" synth bassline and "truncated" percussion, that according to Zuel, comes across as both "alluring and ever-so-slightly sinister". It contains "slow breaks", that according to Jamil Ahmad of musicOMH, "wrap this record round you like walking into an exclusive club with a million dollar sound system – you know you are going to have one of those nights". The pace of the song changes with its chorus, which Mikey MiGo cited as being "a bit off setting".

"FutureSex/LoveSound" is "brimming over with attitude, sharp beats and rhythm", according to Linda McGee of RTÉ.ie. The song, which was described as being "suavely portentous" by Pitchfork Media's Tim Finney, was cited as being a mixture between "the carnal strut" of Nine Inch Nails' "Closer" and the "masochistic flutter" of the Junior Boys. Finney said the song "derives its charm" from its "lofty" aspirations, "like a familiar lover staging an elaborately exaggerated seduction". According to Alexis Petridis of The Guardian, "FutureSex/LoveSound" and the other opening songs of the album are heavily influenced by David Bowie's Diamond Dogs (1974). The song sounds "horny" which can be seen through the lines "Slide a little bit closer to me, little girl / Daddy’s on a mission to please." The chorus of the song reminded 411mania's Mikey MiGo of Prince's "New Power Generation".

Critical response 
Mikey MiGo of 411mania wrote that the song is a "welcomed change" from Timberlake's past work. She stated that the song "has qualities of Prince that I've never seen anyone muster up before". Amanda Murray of Sputnikmusic called the song "musically and melodically great", but criticized its lyrics. She wrote that the lyrics sound like the dialogue of a "low-rent porn film", highlighting the lines: "She's pressed up on me; I think she's ready to blow?" and "All I need is a moment alone, to give you my tongue and get you out of control". According to Murray, "It makes one question exactly what films Timberlake was starring in during his sabbatical." She concluded that "FutureSex/LoveSound" establishes a pattern for the rest of FutureSex/LoveSounds: "infectiously catchy and in many cases accomplished pop music, marred by retardedly retarded lyrics".

In a review of FutureSex/LoveSounds, Ben Williams of New York cited the album's first five tracks, including "FutureSex/LoveSound", as updating the early 1980s Minneapolis sound: "tense drum machines, high-pitched synth squiggles and staccato funk bass lines". While reviewing the album, Stephen Thomas Erlewine of Allmusic noted that the first three songs of the album include the word "sex" in their titles, "as if mere repetition of the word will magically conjure a sex vibe, when in truth it has the opposite effect: it makes it seem that Justin is singing about it because he's not getting it." Lucy Davies of BBC Music stated that it is initially "difficult to listen to the lyrics of the opening tracks and give an objective opinion". She wrote that it is like Timberlake is "trying to find redeemable qualities about some guy who has zero social skills and stares at women on his own from the corner of a bar. Only he seems to have found some similarly unreconstructed creepy friends shouting words of encouragement to his clunky chat-up lines, like Timbaland".

Live performances 
"FutureSex/LoveSound" was used as the opening song on Timberlake's FutureSex/LoveShow in 2007. His performance in New York City is featured on the singer's video album FutureSex/LoveShow: Live from Madison Square Garden (2007). Timberlake performed the song at DIRECTV Super Saturday Night on February 2, 2013 in New Orleans. Prior to the 2013 Grammy Awards, Timberlake held a concert at the Hollywood Palladium in Los Angeles. The singer performed "FutureSex/LoveSound" in a medley with "Need You Tonight" (1987) by INXS and his single "LoveStoned/I Think She Knows" (2007).

Credits and personnel 

Recording and mixing
Recorded at Thomas Crown Studios, Virginia Beach; mixed at The Hit Factory Criteria, Miami, FL.

Personnel

Songwriting – Justin Timberlake, Tim Mosley, Nate "Danja" Hills
Production – Timbaland, Justin Timberlake, Nate "Danja" Hills
Recording - Jimmy Douglass
Mixing – Jimmy Douglas, Timbaland

Keys – Nate "Danja" Hills
Drums – Nate "Danja" Hills, Timbaland
Guitar – Paul Blake
Background vocals – Justin Timberlake

Credits adapted from the liner notes of FutureSex/LoveSounds, Jive Records.

Charts 

Following the release of the album, "FutureSex/LoveSound" did not enter the US Billboard Hot 100, but peaked at number 13 on the Bubbling Under Hot 100 Singles chart.

References 

2006 songs
Justin Timberlake songs
Song recordings produced by Danja (record producer)
Song recordings produced by Timbaland
Songs written by Justin Timberlake
Songs written by Timbaland
Songs written by Danja (record producer)
Song recordings produced by Justin Timberlake